Rudina may refer to:

 In Bosnia and Herzegovina
 Rudina, Donji Vakuf
 In Bulgaria:
 Rudina, Burgas Province
 Rudina, Kardzhali Province
 In Croatia
 Rudina, Croatia, a village on Hvar
 In Romania
 Rudina, a village in Bala Commune, Mehedinţi County
 In Slovakia
 Rudina, Kysucké Nové Mesto District